Sheldon Curtly John (born 27 August 1991) is a British Virgin Islands cricketer. John is a right-handed batsman who bowls right-arm off break. He was born at Tortola.

In February 2008, the British Virgin Islands were invited to take part in the 2008 Stanford 20/20, whose matches held official Twenty20 status. John made a single appearance in the tournament against Dominica in a preliminary round defeat, with John being dismissed for 4 runs by Fernix Thomas. In Dominica's innings, he bowled four wicketless overs which conceded 30 runs.

References

External links
Sheldon John at ESPNcricinfo
Sheldon John at CricketArchive

1991 births
Living people
British Virgin Islands cricketers